The Daxue Range or Daxue Mountains are a great mountain range in the western part of Sichuan province in Southwest China. It is part of the Hengduan Mountains, a complicated system of mountain ranges of western Sichuan, which itself is adjacent to the eastern edge of the Tibetan Plateau.

Geography
The Daxue Mountain Range runs for several hundred kilometers in a general north-south direction, mostly within Sichuan's Garzê Tibetan Autonomous Prefecture.

The Daxue Range marks a transitional zone between the arid Tibetan Plateau and the wetter Sichuan Basin.
It separates the basins of the Yalong River (to the west) and the  Dadu River (to the east). Both rivers flow in the general southern direction, and are tributaries of the Yangtze.

The tallest peak of the range, the Gongga Shan (Minya Konka), measures 7,556 meters in height. It is located in the southern part of the range.

To the east and south of the Gongga Shan, the Daxue Mountains are adjacent to the smaller Daxiangling and Xiaoxiangling ranges, which, however, are usually considered by cartographers as separate ranges.

See also
Hengduan Mountains
Global 200

References

External links
Sichuan Information

Mountain ranges of Sichuan